Veni Vidi Vicious is the second studio album by Swedish rock band the Hives. The album was released on 10 April 2000 through Burning Heart and Epitaph. It was later re-released on 30 April 2002 through Sire and Gearhead. The Japanese release included several extra tracks and other bonus features. The album's title is a play on words which refers to the sentence written by Julius Caesar after conquering Asia Minor in 47 B.C.: "Veni, vidi, vici." (In English: "I came, I saw, I conquered.") The album received universal acclaim from music critics, earning an average critic score of 84/100 on Metacritic.

Reception

In 2005, Veni Vidi Vicious was ranked number 399 in Rock Hard magazine's book The 500 Greatest Rock & Metal Albums of All Time. The album was ranked number 91 on Rolling Stones list of the top 100 albums of the decade. Subsequently, "Hate to Say I Told You So" was ranked number 244 on Pitchforks list of the top 500 songs of 2000–2009.

Commercial performance
As of 2006 the album has sold 416,000 copies in United States. In Europe it has sold over 250,000 copies.

Track listing
All songs written by Randy Fitzsimmons, except "Find Another Girl", written by Jerry Butler and Curtis Mayfield.

Personnel
Howlin' Pelle Almqvist – vocals
Nicholaus Arson – lead guitar (credited as "treble"), backing vocals
Vigilante Carlstroem – rhythm guitar (credited as "middle"), backing vocals
Dr. Matt Destruction – bass guitar
Chris Dangerous – drums (credited as "rythm")
Jari H – tambourines
Kalle – synthesizers

Charts

Weekly charts

Year-end charts

Certifications and sales

References

External links
 Burning Heart Records

The Hives albums
2000 albums
Burning Heart Records albums
Reprise Records albums